Mitch James (born 26 June 1995) is a New Zealand singer, songwriter and guitarist from Auckland. He is best known for his songs "Bright Blue Skies", "Sunday Morning", "No Fixed Abode", "Move On" and "21" which have featured in the Official New Zealand Music Charts. His self-titled first album debuted at No. 2 on the New Zealand chart, No. 1 on the NZ Artist Album Chart and has since been certified Platinum by Recorded Music NZ.

Life and career

Early life 
James was raised in Auckland, New Zealand, where he attended Saint Kentigern College. James taught himself how to play the guitar at the age of 14 by studying YouTube tutorial videos. James has stated that school "wasn't fun" for him and that music became something of a refuge. At age 16 James found inspiration in the likes of Ben Howard and Ed Sheeran. At age 17 James finished school and travelled to London on a one-way airfare in pursuit of a break into the music industry.

2015–2016: Breakthrough and early releases 
In 2015, while in Europe, James began recording and editing cover videos on his phone and sharing them on Facebook and YouTube. In 2016, New Zealand musician Maala spotted one of the videos and shared it with A&r staff at Sony Music New Zealand. James returned to New Zealand and signed with the label shortly after.

On 1 December 2016 James released his first single "No Fixed Abode" along with its accompanying music video. On 9 December 2016 James released his second single "Move On.

In March 2017, James completed The Humble Roadie Tour, a ten date national tour of New Zealand. James and his crew travelled the entire length of the tour in a custom Kombi van.

James indicated he intended to release his debut album in October/November 2017.

2018–present: Debut album 
In May 2018, James released "21", the first single off his debut self-titled album, which was scheduled to be released in September 2018. 21 peaked at #2 on the NZ Singles chart. By October, "21" was certified Gold by RMNZ. 21 was then nominated for "Single of the Year" at the New Zealand Music Awards.

James then went on to release his self-titled debut album "Mitch James" on 14 September 2018. The album was produced by Ji Fraser and Eli Paewai of Six60. The album debuted at No. 2 on the Overall NZ Music Chart, and No. 1 on the NZ Albums Chart. The album has garnered over 100,000,000 streams as of 1 September 2019 and has since been certified Platinum in New Zealand.

James embarked on his first major headline tour of New Zealand shortly after release.

James was nominated and won MTV Europe Music Award for Best New Zealand Act in October.

In March 2018, James opened for Ed Sheeran on his ÷ Tour for all three Dunedin dates.

In Summer 2019–2020 James opened for Six60 on their world tour.

Discography

Albums

Extended plays

Singles

Awards and nominations

Tours 
 Humble Roadie Tour (2017)
NZ and Australia Album Tour (2018)
Bright Blue Skies UK and NZ Tour (2019)
Drax Project and Mitch James Tour (2021)
Bridges World Tour w/ Calum Scott (2022)

Notes

References 

Living people
1995 births
Musicians from Auckland
New Zealand male singer-songwriters
People educated at Saint Kentigern College
21st-century New Zealand male singers
Sony Music New Zealand artists